Lana may refer to:
Lana (given name)
Francesco Lana de Terzi (1631–1687), Italian Jesuit priest and scientist
Lana (wrestler), professional wrestler and pro wrestling manager 
Wild Energy. Lana, a 2006 Ukrainian fantasy novel

Sciences
LANA, Latency-associated nuclear antigen
Lana (chimpanzee), a language research chimpanzee

Music
"Lana", a song by Roy Orbison from his album Crying
"Lana", song by The Beach Boys from their 1963 album Surfin' U.S.A.
 Lana (album), an album by Lana Jurčević

Geography
Lana, South Tyrol, municipality in autonomous province South Tyrol, Italy
Lana, Navarre, town and municipality in the province and autonomous community of Navarre, Spain
Lanë, stream in Tirana, Albania

See also
Lānaʻi, the sixth-largest of the Hawaiian Islands, also known as the Pineapple Island
Lanna (disambiguation)
Lanner (disambiguation)
Larna, Asturias, Spain